Yang Chunhe (born 16 January 1962) is a Chinese engineer who is a researcher at the Institute of Rock and Soil Mechanics, Chinese Academy of Sciences.

Biography
Yang was born in Fengcheng, Jiangxi, on January 16, 1962. He attended Rongtang High School. He attended Jiangxi University of Science and Technology where he received his bachelor's degree in mining in 1983. After completing his master's degree at the Institute of Rock and Soil Mechanics, Chinese Academy of Sciences, he attended University of Nevada, Reno in the United States where he obtained his doctor's degree in geological engineering in 1999. After returning to China, he joined the Institute of Rock and Soil Mechanics, Chinese Academy of Sciences as a researcher.

Honours and awards
 2016 8th Guanghua Engineering Technology Award
 November 22, 2019 Member of the Chinese Academy of Engineering (CAE)

References

External links
Yang Chunhe on the Institute of Rock and Soil Mechanics, Chinese Academy of Sciences  

1962 births
Living people
People from Fengcheng, Jiangxi
Engineers from Jiangxi
Jiangxi University of Science and Technology alumni
University of Nevada, Reno alumni
Members of the Chinese Academy of Engineering